Albert Peter Burleigh (born March 7, 1942) is an American diplomat who worked as a Foreign Service Officer and joined the American Academy of Diplomacy.

Biography
Burleigh was born March 7, 1942, in Los Angeles, California. He graduated from Colgate University with a Bachelor of Arts in 1963.  He was a Peace Corps volunteer in Nepal from 1963 to 1965, during which time he mastered the Nepali language.  In addition to that language, he speaks Bengali, Hindi, and Sinhalese.

He served as United States Ambassador to Sri Lanka 1995–97, serving concurrently as Ambassador to the Maldives. In 1998–99, he was chargé d'affaires of the U.S. Mission to the United Nations. In 1999, President Clinton nominated Burleigh for the post of United States Ambassador to the Philippines and Palau, but the U.S. Senate never acted upon the nomination, and it was eventually withdrawn. In 2009 and again in 2011 he was appointed chargé d'affaires of the U.S. Embassy in New Delhi, pending appointments first of Timothy Roemer and of Nancy Jo Powell as ambassador.

He is a visiting professor of international affairs at the University of Miami.

References

External links

|-

|-

|-

|-

1942 births
Living people
Ambassadors of the United States to Sri Lanka
Ambassadors of the United States to the Maldives
People from Los Angeles
Permanent Representatives of the United States to the United Nations
University of Miami faculty
United States Foreign Service personnel
20th-century American diplomats
21st-century American diplomats